Ponometia virginalis is a species of bird dropping moth in the family Noctuidae. It is found in North America, where it has been recorded from eastern Texas to Nebraska, west to eastern Arizona in the south, and to Utah, Colorado, and Wyoming in the west.

The length of the forewings is about 10 mm.

The MONA or Hodges number for Ponometia virginalis is 9088.

References

Further reading

 
 
 

Acontiinae
Moths described in 1881